Passed Away, Vol. 1 is a digital compilation by Dr. Dog. The album, which was released March 4, 2008, is a collection of songs from a variety of times and places, found on old tapes and demos, that the band wished to release. The songs are more lo-fi than the latter releases of Dr. Dog, comparable to their early work. Dr. Dog's traditional style of frequent doo-wop melodies occur as well, which becomes a highly noticeable characteristic for the album. All of the songs have been streaming prior to their release, at the promotional website for their previous record, We All Belong.

Track listing

Notes

Dr. Dog albums
2008 compilation albums